Carpenter's Fort, Ohio is a historical community located in Jefferson County, Ohio.

History
Carpenter's Fort or Carpenter's Station as it was sometimes called, was established in the summer of 1781 when John Carpenter built a fortified house above the mouth of Short Creek on the Ohio side of the Ohio River in what is now Jefferson County, Ohio, near Rayland, Ohio.   John Carpenter, born c1737-1738, died in Aug 1806 in Coshocton County, Ohio, reportedly served in the American Revolutionary War from Virginia under George Washington.

References

Further reading
 William G. Wolfe: Stories of Guernsey County, Ohio, History of an Average Ohio County, published by the Author, Cambridge, O., 1943, pp. 873–875 
 N. N. Hill Jr.: History Of Coshocton County, Ohio, Its Past And Present, 1740-1881
 A. A. Graham & Co., Publishers, Newark, O., 1881
 John H. Gwathmey: Historical Register of Virginians in the Revolution, Soldiers, Sailors, Marines, 1775-1783
 Dietz Press, Richmond, Va., 1938., p. 31
 Frank D. Henderson, John R. Rea, and Jane Down Dailey: The Official Roster of the Soldiers of the American Revolution Buried in the State of Ohio, The F. J. Heer Printing Co., Columbus, O., 1929, p. 69
 J. A. Caldwell: History of Belmont and Jefferson County, Ohio, 1880, cited in The Epistle, Rosemary Bachelor, ed., Vol. XIII, No. 6, November 1987, p. 32
 History of the Upper Ohio Valley with Family History and Biographical Sketches, Brant & Fuller, Madison, Wis., 1890, pp. 32–33.

Populated places in Coshocton County, Ohio